Tokoriki is an island within the Mamanuca Islands of Fiji in the South Pacific. It is home to two independent resorts, the privately owned luxury award winning resort Tokoriki Island Resort for honeymooners and couples and nearby is the Marriott Sheraton Resort & Spa. The island has its own reef which has many diving and snorkeling sites.

References 

Islands of Fiji
Ba Province
Mamanuca Islands